The Casa-Museo Federico García Lorca, better known as Huerta de San Vicente, was the García Lorca family's historical summer home, from 1926 to 1936.

The house and orchards are now at the heart of Granada's Park Federico García Lorca, which was inaugurated in 1995.

History 
The estate was built during the second half of the 19th century, and used to be called "Huerta de los Mudos". Federico García Rodríguez, father of Federico García Lorca, bought the house on 27 May 1925. He changed the name as a tribute to her wife, Vicenta Lorca Romero, into "Huerta de Vicente". The house remains basically the same as it was.

Federico García Lorca wrote there some of his most famous masterpieces, such as Blood wedding (1932) and Yerma (1934).

He was at the Huerta de San Vicente the days prior to his assassination, before deciding to take refuge at his friend Luis Rosales's home, where he was arrested.

The García Lorca family had to leave Spain in 1941 because of the dictatorship of Francisco Franco, and moved to the United States. However, they still owned the estate.

Museum 

On 6 April 1985, Isabel García Lorca gave the estate up to the city of Granada in order to establish a museum dedicated to the poet. The art centre was inaugurated on 10 May 1995.

See also 
 Federico García Lorca

References

External links 
 Official website

Federico García Lorca
1995 establishments in Spain
Andalusia
Art museums established in 1995
Biographical museums in Spain
Buildings and structures in Granada
Museums devoted to one artist
Buildings and structures completed in 1995
Granada
Gardens in Spain
Open-air museums in Spain
Spanish gardens
Bien de Interés Cultural landmarks in the Province of Granada